The Mack Morton Barn is a historic eleven-sided barn at 11516 Appleby Road in Appleby, Arkansas.  Built about 1900 to house cows and horses, it is sheathed in board-and-batten siding and topped by a hip roof with an eleven-sided cupola at the center.  It is believed to be the only surviving geometrically unusual barn in the state.

The barn was listed on the National Register of Historic Places in 2005.

See also
National Register of Historic Places listings in Washington County, Arkansas

References

Barns on the National Register of Historic Places in Arkansas
Buildings and structures completed in 1900
National Register of Historic Places in Washington County, Arkansas
1900 establishments in Arkansas